Hyadaphis coriandri, the coriander aphid, is a species of aphid in the family Aphididae.

References

 "Adventive aphids (Hemiptera: Aphididae) of America north of Mexico", Foottit R.G., Halbert S.E., Miller G.L., Maw E., Russell L.M. 2006. Proc. Ent. Soc. Wash. 108: 583–610.

Further reading

 

Insects described in 1918
Macrosiphini